Walnut Township is a township in Butler County, Kansas, USA.  As of the 2000 census, its population was 760.

Walnut Township was organized in 1867.

Geography
According to the USGS, it contains three cemeteries: Fairview, Golden and Little Walnut.

The stream of Fourmile Creek runs through this township.

Further reading

References

 USGS Geographic Names Information System (GNIS)

External links
 City-Data.com

Townships in Butler County, Kansas
Townships in Kansas